This article lists some of the events that took place in the Netherlands in 2005.

Incumbents
Monarch: Beatrix
Prime Minister: Jan Peter Balkenende

Events

January
 1 January - New Year's celebrations all over the Netherlands fall silent for two minutes as mark of respect for Dutch memorial service for those affected by the 2004 Indian Ocean tsunami.

February

March

April
 8: A referendum is held in Curaçao on independence vs. integration with The Netherlands.

May
 31: A storage tank explodes in Warffum, Groningen killing 2 men and severely injuring another.

June
 1: The Dutch electorate reject in a referendum the Constitutional Treaty for Europe.
 28: The stockholders of Koninklijke Olie and Shell agree to a complete merger. The new enterprise is called Royal Dutch Shell, is designed after English law and has her headquarters in The Hague.

July

August
 13: Talpa begins with the broadcasting of TV programs

September
 11: Dennis van der Geest becomes world champion judo in Cairo judo in the open division. 
 13: The Public Ministry confesses in having made great mistakes in their Schiedamse park murder investigation.

October
 27: Eleven soon to be deported asylum seekers die in a fire at the Schiphol-East detention center.

November
 2: John Mieremet is assassinated in Thailand and Kees Houtman a real estate agent related to the criminal underworld is also assassinated in Amsterdam 
 14: Domino Day 2005 sparrow - A house sparrow, Passer domesticus, was shot and killed during preparations for Domino Day 2005.
 15: Political activist, publicist and journalist Louis Sévèke is shot and killed in the center of Nijmegen. 
 25: Severe weather creates the longest evening peak traffic jam in The Netherlands ever: there is 802 kilometer traffic jam at 18.00 o'clock. Only at 05.20 o'clock, the next morning, all traffic jams are resolved. Hundreds of travelers (also by train) spend the night in shelters.

December
 5: Start of the trail against the members of the Hofstad Network.

Sport
 2004–05 Eredivisie
 2004–05 Eerste Divisie
 2004–05 KNVB Cup
 2005 Johan Cruijff Schaal
 Haile Gebrselassie wins the Amsterdam Marathon

Births

 26 June – Princess Alexia of the Netherlands

Deaths

See also
2005 in Dutch television

References

 
Years of the 21st century in the Netherlands
2000s in the Netherlands
Netherlands